36P/Whipple is a periodic comet in the Solar System. It is the lowest numbered Quasi-Hilda comet.

The comet nucleus is estimated to be 4.5 kilometers in diameter.

References

External links 
 36P at Kronk's Cometography
 36P/Whipple – Seiichi Yoshida @ aerith.net
 

Periodic comets
0036
Comets in 2011
19331015